Charles Guernier (26 April 1870 – 19 February 1943) was a French politician.
He was deputy for Ille-et-Vilaine from 1906 to 1924 and from 1928 to 1942.
He was Minister of Posts, Telegraphs, and Telephones from 1931 to 1932, and Minister of Public Works and the Merchant Marine in 1932.

Early years

Charles Guernier was born on 26 April 1870 in Saint-Malo, Ille-et-Vilaine.
Guernier grew up in Saint-Malo, then was admitted to the University of Rennes.
He studied Law, and obtained his doctorate in 1897 with a thesis on Scottish crofters.
He lectured at the Faculty of Law in the University of Paris, then taught a course on Political Economy and History of Economic Doctrines in the Faculty of Law of the University of Lyon.
He was a professor at the University of Lille from 1898 to 1905.

Political career

Guernier was elected deputy for the first district of Saint-Malo, Ille-et-Vilaine, on 6 May 1906 .
He sat with the Gauche démocratique (Democratic Left).
He was reelected on 20 April 1910, and sat with the same group.
He became a general councilor for Ille-et-Vilaine representing the canton of Cancale in 1910, and  held this seat for thirty years.
On 26 April 1914 he was again elected deputy and sat with the Gauche radicale (Radical Left).

Throughout his parliamentary career Guernier was involved in foreign policy and the merchant navy.
He was under-secretary of state for the Merchant Navy from 10–13 June 1914.
He was high commissioner to the British government for regulation of allied maritime affairs from 10 April 1917 to 12 September 1917.
At the end of this assignment he was appointed Commander of the Order of the Bath.

On 16 November 1919 Guernier was reelected deputy and sat with the Gauche républicaine démocratique (Democratic Republican Left).
He was elected chairman of the Ille-et-Vilaine council in 1921 in place of René Brice, who had died, and held the presidency until 1924.
He was defeated in the parliamentary election of 1924.
On 29 April 1928 Guernier was elected deputy for Ille-et-Vilaine and sat with the Gauche radicale (Radical Left).
He represented the first district of Saint-Malo.

Guernier was Minister of Posts, Telegraphs and Telephones from 27 January 1931 to 20 February 1932.
In this post Guernier said public broadcasting had to "establish across the nation a continuous spiritual connection so that alongside the grand national works that advantage Paris and our other large cities, the innumerable equally powerful and precious works generated throughout many parts of our provinces can also be diffused over the entire country.
On 1 May 1932 he was reelected deputy, and sat with the Gauche radicale list.
He was reelected on 26 April 1936.

On 10 July 1940 Guernier was among the deputies of the Democratic and Radical Independent Left who voted for the constitutional change requested by Marshal Philippe Pétain that established the Vichy government.
He died on 19 February 1943 in Paris, aged 72.

Publications

Notes

Sources

External links
 

1870 births
1943 deaths
Politicians from Saint-Malo
Democratic Republican Alliance politicians
Independent Radical politicians
French Ministers of Posts, Telegraphs, and Telephones
French Ministers of Public Works
French Ministers of Merchant Marine
Members of the 9th Chamber of Deputies of the French Third Republic
Members of the 10th Chamber of Deputies of the French Third Republic
Members of the 11th Chamber of Deputies of the French Third Republic
Members of the 12th Chamber of Deputies of the French Third Republic
Members of the 14th Chamber of Deputies of the French Third Republic
Members of the 15th Chamber of Deputies of the French Third Republic
Members of the 16th Chamber of Deputies of the French Third Republic